The Legislative Assembly of the Macau Special Administrative Region is the organ of the legislative branch of Macau. It is a 33-member body comprising 14 directly elected members, 12 indirectly elected members representing functional constituencies and 7 members appointed by the chief executive. It is located at Sé.

Charter 
The assembly has the following charter:

 To enact, amend, suspend or repeal laws;
 To examine and approve budgets; and examine the report on audit;
 To decide on taxation and approve debts to be undertaken by the government
 To debate the policy addresses by the Chief Executive;
 To debate any issue concerning public interests;
 To receive and handle complaints from Macau residents

Election results

Legislative assembly buildings
The assembly sits at a special Legislative Assembly building, a modern three-storey structure located in the Nam Van area.

From 1784 to 1999, the Assembly met at the Leal Senado Building.

Selection methods
According to Annex II of the Basic Law of Macau, the first Legislative Assembly following the establishment of the special administrative region would be constituted in accordance with the Decision of the National People's Congress on the Methodology for the Formation of the First Government, the First Legislative Assembly and the Judicial Bodies of the Macau Special Administrative Region – i.e., 23 members: 8 directly elected, 8 indirectly elected and 7 appointed members.

The second Legislative Assembly would be composed of 27 members: 10 directly elected, 10 indirectly elected and 7 appointed members.

In accordance with Annex II, the number of directly elected legislators for the third Legislative Assembly increased from 10 to 12 in 2005, bringing the number of legislators to 29. After 2009, the selection of the Chief Executive may be changed by ⅔ endorsement of the Legislative Assembly and approval by the National People's Congress Standing Committee. Following 2012 reforms, the Legislative Assembly is now composed of 33 members: 14 directly elected, 12 indirectly elected and 7 appointed members.

Compositions

See also
Chief Executive of Macau
Executive Council of Macau
Municipal Council of Macau
List of members of the Legislative Assembly of Macau
Legislative Council of Hong Kong

References

External links

 
 Members of the Assembly of Macau 
 The Basic Law of Macau: The Legislature (Government website) University of Macau
 Regulations of the Legislative Assembly (Approved by Legislative Assembly Resolution No. 1/1999, as amended): in Chinese, in Portuguese
 Legislative Session of the Legislative Assembly and the Member Statute (Law No. 3/2000, as amended) in Chinese, in Portuguese
 Organic Law of the Legislative Assembly (Law No. 11/2000, as amended): in Chinese, in Portuguese
 Electoral Law (Law No. 3/2001): in Chinese, in Portuguese

 
Politics of Macau
Macau
Macau